Runcorn was a parliamentary constituency centred on the town of Runcorn in Cheshire. It returned one Member of Parliament (MP) to the House of Commons of the Parliament of the United Kingdom, elected by the first past the post system.

History 
Runcorn was created for the 1950 general election from parts of several constituencies.

It was abolished following the reorganisation of local authorities in 1974 by the Third Periodic Review of Westminster constituencies for the 1983 general election, when it was divided primarily between the re-established constituency of Eddisbury and the new constituencies of Halton and Warrington South.

Boundaries 
1950-1983: The Urban Districts of Runcorn and Lymm, and the Rural District of Runcorn.

The Urban District of Runcorn was transferred from Northwich and Lymm was previously part of the abolished constituency of Bucklow. The Rural District of Runcorn (including Frodsham, Helsby, Grappenhall and Stockton Heath) was previously split between Knutsford, Northwich and the abolished Eddisbury constituency.

From 1 April 1974 until the constituency was abolished at the next boundary review which came into effect for the 1983 general election, the constituency comprised parts of the expanded Borough of Warrington and the newly formed Borough of Halton, and the District of Vale Royal, but its boundaries were unchanged.

On abolition, the western half of Runcorn, was included in the new constituency of Halton along with the town of Widnes (on the northern side of the Mersey). The eastern half of the town forms part of the Weaver Vale constituency, along with Northwich, Frodsham, Helsby and surrounding areas.

Members of Parliament

Elections

Elections in the 1950s

Elections in the 1960s

Elections in the 1970s

See also 

 History of parliamentary constituencies and boundaries in Cheshire

References 

Parliamentary constituencies in Cheshire (historic)
Constituencies of the Parliament of the United Kingdom established in 1950
Constituencies of the Parliament of the United Kingdom disestablished in 1983
Runcorn